Robert P. Dunn (August 28, 1890 – March 24, 1937) was a comic actor who was one of the original Keystone Kops in Hoffmeyer's Legacy.

Early years 
Dunn was born in Milwaukee, Wisconsin, to Richard P. and Melissa Dunn, and attended St. Johns Military Academy. He was a world-champion high-diver with Dr. Carver's diving horses.

Career
Dunn started his film career at Keystone Studios with Mack Sennett and worked as a comedian and stuntman for a variety of other film studios as well. He lost many of his teeth and suffered other injuries performing stunts as well, including the loss of one of his eyes when he fell into a barrel of water and his eye was irreparably damaged by a floating matchstick. The glass eye he wore after that accident gave him a somewhat "cross-eyed" appearance, although that effect "served only to empower his comedic career." Later, during the 1920s and 1930s, he performed as a supporting player for many of the film industry's leading comedians, such as Harold Lloyd, W. C. Fields, Charley Chase, the Marx Brothers, and Laurel and Hardy.

Death
Dunn died of a heart attack on March 24, 1937, in Hollywood, California, at the age of 46. His grave site is at Hollywood Forever Cemetery in Los Angeles.

Selected filmography

Hoffmeyer's Legacy (1912, Short) - Keystone Kop (uncredited)
In and Out (1914, Short)
A Hash House Fraud (1915, Short)
Hogan, the Porter (1915, Short) - Desk Clerk
Hogan's Mussy Job (1915, Short) - Apartment House Manager
Fatty's New Role (1915, Short) - Grocer (uncredited)
Hogan's Romance Upset (1915, Short) - Weary Willie
Hogan's Aristocratic Dream (1915, Short) - Hogan's Valet
Hogan Out West (1915, Short) - Hogan's Rival
A Versatile Villain (1915, Short)
The Little Teacher (1915, Short) - 3rd Unruly Student
Those Bitter Sweets (1915, Short)
Fatty's Tintype Tangle (1915, Short) - Laughing Man (uncredited)
A Game Old Knight (1915, Short)
Fickle Fatty's Fall (1915, Short) - Man in Shower
Hogan's Wild Oats (1915, Short) - Theatre Patron (uncredited)
His Auto Ruination (1916, Short) - The Janitor
His Pride and Shame (1916, Short) - Red Dugan
By Stork Delivery (1916, Short) - The Janitor
His Last Laugh (1916, Short) - The Holdup Man
His Bread and Butter (1916, Short) - The Head Waiter
Bath Tub Perils (1916, Short) - Bathing Suited Guest in Room (uncredited)
Bubbles of Trouble (1916, Short) - The True Love's Pal
The Winning Punch (1916, Short) - Slim's Rival
His Busted Trust (1916, Short) - The Sculptor
Villa of the Movies (1917, Short) - The Landlord
Secrets of a Beauty Parlor (1917, Short)
A Maiden's Trust (1917, Short) - Minor Role (uncredited)
Two Crooks (1917, Short) - 2nd Crook
Are Waitresses Safe? (1917, Short) - Party Guest (uncredited)
Hero for a Minute (1917, Short) - Kid Cameraflage
Barbarous Plots (1918, Short)
A Flyer in Folly (1918, Short) - Jasper Junk
A High Diver's Last Kiss (1918, Short)
East Lynne with Variations (1919, Short) - Minor Role (uncredited)
Lions and Ladies (1919, Short)
Yankee Doodle in Berlin (1919) - Minor Role (uncredited)
His Naughty Wife (1919, Short)
Skirts (1921)
His Fiery Beat (1921, Short)
Be Reasonable (1921, Short) - The Girl's Father
Oh, Mabel Behave (1922) - Inn Patron (uncredited)
Fresh Paint (1922, Short)
Hands Up (1922, Short)
All Wrong (1922, Short) - The Boob
Give Me Air (1922, Short)
The Fast Mailman (1922)
Our Alley (1923)
Ain't Love Awful? (1923, Short)
Hot Foot (1923, Short)
Oh! Shoot (1923, Short)
No Danger (1923, Short)
My Error (1923, Short)
All Is Lost (1923, Short)
The Rivals (1923, Short) - Bobby
Why Wait? (1924, Short)
This Way Out (1924, Short)
Easy Work (1924, Short)
Easy Money (1924, Short)
A Fake Alarm (1924, Short)
Unmounted Policemen (1924, Short)
Keep Healthy (1924, Short)
Ship Ahoy! (1924, Short)
Green Grocers (1924, Short)
Politics (1924, Short)
Flapper Fever (1924, Short)
My Little Brother (1924, Short)
Case Dismissed (1924, Short)
Miners Over 21 (1924, Short)
The Cry Baby (1924, Short)
I'm Cured (1924, Short)
Hello, 'Frisco (1924, Short) - Bobby
The Plumber's Helper (1924, Short)
The General Store (1924, Short)
Tee for Two (1925, Short) - Subway Guard
Whispering Whiskers (1926, Short) - Minor Role (uncredited)
 The Thrill Hunter (1926) - Ferdie
Wandering Willies (1926, Short) - Waiter
Alice Be Good (1926, Short) - Flirty Dancer
When the Wife's Away (1926)
Masked Mamas (1926, Short) - Guest in Lobby / Drunk on Street (uncredited)
The Divorce Dodger (1926, Short) - Apartment Tenant
A Dozen Socks (1927, Short) - Trainer
Why Girls Love Sailors (1927, Short) - Bemused Sailor (uncredited)
Love in a Police Station (1927, Short) - Cop
The Upland Rider (1928) - Shorty
Speedy (1928) - Tough (uncredited)
The Barker (1928) - Hamburger Concessionaire (uncredited)
The Power of the Press (1928) - Taxicab Driver (uncredited)
Taxi Spooks (1929, Short)
The Royal Rider (1929) - Wild West Show Member
 An Oklahoma Cowboy (1929)
 Captain Cowboy (1929)
The Wagon Master (1929) - Buckeye Pete
 Riders of the Storm (1929)
Bacon Grabbers (1929, Short)
 Oh, Yeah! (1929) - Railroad Man at Bonfire (uncredited)
The Racketeer (1929) - The Rat
The Trespasser (1929) - Milkman (uncredited)
Code of the West (1929) - Shorty Gordon
Neath Western Skies (1929) - Percival Givens
The Parting of the Trails (1930) - 'Restless' Roberts
Parade of the West (1930) - Shorty
Loose Ankles (1930) - Butler (uncredited)
 Call of the Desert (1930) - Hardrock
The Fighting Legion (1930) - Waiter (uncredited)
Le joueur de golf (1930) - (uncredited)
Half-Pint Polly (1930, Short) - Spud
 The Canyon of Missing Men (1930) - Gimpy Lamb
America or Bust (1930, Short)
Canyon Hawks (1930) - Shorty
Trails of Danger (1930) - Deputy Shorty
The Lottery Bride (1930) - Miner (uncredited)
Phantom of the Desert (1930) - Short Cowhand (uncredited)
Breed of the West (1930) - Shorty
Reducing (1931) - Train Station Extra (uncredited)
Hell's Valley (1931) - Shorty, Texas Ranger
Sweepstakes (1931) - Bidder at Horse Auction (uncredited)
Pardon Us (1931) - Insurgent Convict (uncredited)
Monkey Business (1931) - Gangster (uncredited)
Side Show (1931) - Little Man (uncredited)
The Phantom (1931) - Shorty - the Chauffeur
Bad Company (1931) - Hood Shot on Balcony (uncredited)
Half Holiday (1931, Short) - Ice Cream Man (uncredited)
The Last Ride (1931) - Dink
Taxi! (1932) - Cab Driver at Meeting (uncredited)
Lady! Please! (1932, Short) - Janitor (uncredited)
The Flirty Sleepwalker (1932, Short) - Caddy Master
Million Dollar Legs (1932) - Klopstokian Athlete (uncredited)
Honeymoon Beach (1932, Short) - Billy's Butler
The Dentist (1932, Short) - Dentist's Caddy (uncredited)
Hypnotized (1932) - Sailor (uncredited)
Terror Aboard (1933) - Cross-eyed Sailor
Me and My Pal (1933, Short) - Telegram Messenger (uncredited)
Don't Bet on Love (1933) - Cross-Eyed Bettor (uncredited)
The Bowery (1933) - Cockeyed Violinist (uncredited)
Son of a Sailor (1933) - Sailor (uncredited)
You Can't Buy Everything (1934) - News Vendor (uncredited)
Wheels of Destiny (1934) - Wagon Driver (uncredited)
Twisted Rails (1934) - Bolivar's Henchman (uncredited)
Broadway Bill (1934) - (uncredited)
Tit for Tat (1935, Short) - Customer (uncredited)
One More Spring (1935) - Bum (uncredited)
One Run Elmer (1935, Short) - Pitcher (uncredited)
George White's 1935 Scandals (1935) - Cross-Eyed Man (uncredited)
The Roaring West (1935) - Freighter (uncredited)
Bonnie Scotland (1935) - Native Henchman / Man Dispensing Flyers (uncredited)
Redheads on Parade (1935) - Grip (uncredited)
Here Comes Cookie (1935) - Old Crony (uncredited)
The Bohemian Girl (1936) - Cockeyed Bartender (uncredited)
The Lucky Corner (1936, Short) - 'Poisoned' customer
Mr. Deeds Goes to Town (1936) - Minor Role (uncredited)
Arbor Day (1936, Short) - Crowd Extra
Neighborhood House (1936) - Irate Moviegoer (uncredited)
Our Relations (1936) - Messenger Boy (uncredited)
Way Out West (1937) - Barfly (uncredited)
Slave Ship (1937) - Crew Member (uncredited)
Religious Racketeers (1938) - Holy Man (uncredited) (final film role)

References

External links

 
 F.V.H. (film virtual history person) B. Dunn

1890 births
1937 deaths
Burials at Hollywood Forever Cemetery
American male silent film actors
Male actors from Milwaukee
Hal Roach Studios actors
20th-century American male actors
Articles containing video clips